In mathematics, a profinite group is a topological group that is in a certain sense assembled from a system of finite groups. 

The idea of using a profinite group is to provide a "uniform", or "synoptic", view of an entire system of finite groups. Properties of the profinite group are generally speaking uniform properties of the system. For example, the profinite group is finitely generated (as a topological group) if and only if there exists  such that every group in the system can be generated by  elements. Many theorems about finite groups can be readily generalised to profinite groups; examples are  Lagrange's theorem and the Sylow theorems.

To construct a profinite group one needs a system of finite groups and group homomorphisms between them. Without loss of generality, these homomorphisms can be assumed to be surjective, in which case the finite groups will appear as quotient groups of the resulting profinite group; in a sense, these quotients approximate the profinite group. 

Important examples of profinite groups are the additive groups of -adic integers and the Galois groups of infinite-degree field extensions.

Every profinite group is compact and totally disconnected. A non-compact generalization of the concept is that of locally profinite groups. Even more general are the totally disconnected groups.

Definition

Profinite groups can be defined in either of two equivalent ways.

First definition (constructive)

A profinite group is a topological group that is isomorphic to the inverse limit of an inverse system of discrete finite groups.

equipped with the relative product topology.

One can also define the inverse limit in terms of a universal property. In categorical terms, this is a special case of a cofiltered limit construction.

Second definition (axiomatic)

A profinite group is a Hausdorff, compact, and totally disconnected topological group: that is, a topological group that is also a Stone space.

Profinite completion

There is a natural homomorphism  and the image of  under this homomorphism is dense in  The homomorphism  is injective if and only if the group  is residually finite (i.e.,
 where the intersection runs through all normal subgroups of finite index).

The homomorphism  is characterized by the following universal property: given any profinite group  and any continuous group homomorphism  where  is given the smallest topology compatible with group operations in which its normal subgroups of finite index are open, there exists a unique continuous group homomorphism  with

Equivalence

Any group constructed by the first definition satisfies the axioms in the second definition.

Conversely, any group  satisfying the axioms in the second definition can be constructed as an inverse limit according to the first definition using the inverse limit  where  ranges through the open normal subgroups of  ordered by (reverse) inclusion. If  is topologically finitely generated then it is in addition equal to its own profinite completion

Surjective systems

In practice, the inverse system of finite groups is almost always , meaning that all its maps are surjective. Without loss of generality, it suffices to consider only surjective systems since given any inverse system, it is possible to first construct its profinite group  and then  it as its own profinite completion.

Examples

 Finite groups are profinite, if given the discrete topology.
 The group of -adic integers  under addition is profinite (in fact procyclic). It is the inverse limit of the finite groups  where  ranges over all natural numbers and the natural maps  for  The topology on this profinite group is the same as the topology arising from the -adic valuation on 
 The group of profinite integers  is the profinite completion of  In detail, it is the inverse limit of the finite groups  where  with the modulo maps  for  This group is the product of all the groups  and it is the absolute Galois group of any finite field.
 The Galois theory of field extensions of infinite degree gives rise naturally to Galois groups that are profinite. Specifically, if  is a Galois extension, consider the group  consisting of all field automorphisms of  that keep all elements of  fixed. This group is the inverse limit of the finite groups  where  ranges over all intermediate fields such that  is a  Galois extension. In fact, for many fields  one does not know in general precisely which finite groups occur as Galois groups over  This is the inverse Galois problem for a field  (For some fields  the inverse Galois problem is settled, such as the field of rational functions in one variable over the complex numbers.) Not every profinite group occurs as an absolute Galois group of a field.
 The étale fundamental groups considered in algebraic geometry are also profinite groups, roughly speaking because the algebra can only 'see' finite coverings of an algebraic variety. The fundamental groups of algebraic topology, however, are in general not profinite: for any prescribed group, there is a 2-dimensional CW complex whose fundamental group equals it.
 The automorphism group of a locally finite rooted tree is profinite.

Properties and facts

 Every product of (arbitrarily many) profinite groups is profinite; the topology arising from the profiniteness agrees with the product topology. The inverse limit of an inverse system of profinite groups with continuous transition maps is profinite and the inverse limit functor is exact on the category of profinite groups. Further, being profinite is an extension property.
 Every closed subgroup of a profinite group is itself profinite; the topology arising from the profiniteness agrees with the subspace topology. If  is a closed normal subgroup of a profinite group  then the factor group  is profinite; the topology arising from the profiniteness agrees with the quotient topology.
 A subgroup of a profinite group is open if and only if it is closed and has finite index.
 According to a theorem of Nikolay Nikolov and Dan Segal, in any topologically finitely generated profinite group (that is, a profinite group that has a dense finitely generated subgroup) the subgroups of finite index are open. This generalizes an earlier analogous result of Jean-Pierre Serre for topologically finitely generated pro- groups. The proof uses the classification of finite simple groups.
Furthermore,  is also continuous, so  is a homeomorphism. Therefore the topology on a topologically finitely generated profinite group is uniquely determined by its  structure.

Ind-finite groups

(In particular, it is an ind-group.) The usual terminology is different: a group  is called locally finite if every finitely generated subgroup is finite. This is equivalent, in fact, to being 'ind-finite'.

By applying Pontryagin duality, one can see that abelian profinite groups are in duality with locally finite discrete abelian groups. The latter are just the abelian torsion groups.

Projective profinite groups

A profinite group is  if it has the lifting property for every extension.  This is equivalent to saying that  is projective if for every surjective morphism from a profinite  there is a section 

Projectivity for a profinite group  is equivalent to either of the two properties:
 the cohomological dimension 

Every projective profinite group can be realized as an absolute Galois group of a pseudo algebraically closed field. This result is due to Alexander Lubotzky and Lou van den Dries.

Procyclic group

A profinite group  is  if it is topologically generated by a single element  that is, if  the closure of the subgroup 

See also

References

 
.
.
.
. Review of several books about profinite groups. 
.  
.

Infinite group theory
Topological groups